L3, L03, L.3 or L-3 may refer to:

In arts and media
 Live, Loud & Local, a show launched by band The Matches in the Oakland, California region
 Leprechaun 3, a film
 L3-37, a droid in Solo: A Star Wars Story
 Lower third, in television and film a graphic overlay placed in the title-safe lower area of the screen.

Businesses
 L3 Technologies, a company that provided intelligence, surveillance, and reconnaissance systems prior to a merger with Harris Corporation to form L3Harris Technologies in 2019
 DHL De Guatemala (IATA code L3), a cargo airline based in Guatemala
 LTU Austria (IATA code L3), an airline based in Austria

In science and technology

Biology and medicine
 L3, the third lumbar vertebra, in human anatomy
 the third larval stage in the Caenorhabditis elegans worm development
 ATC code L03 Immunostimulants, a subgroup of the Anatomical Therapeutic Chemical Classification System
 Haplogroup L3 (mtDNA), a human mitochondrial DNA (mtDNA) haplogroup generally found in East Africa

Computing and telecommunications
 L-3, an L-carrier cable system developed by AT&T
 L3 microkernel, a microkernel operating system by German computer scientist Jochen Liedtke
 The Level-3 CPU cache in a computer
 ISO/IEC 8859-3 (Latin-3), an 8-bit character encoding
 L3 technical support, the highest level dealing with the most difficult or advanced problems.

Transportation

Air- and spacecraft
 Aeronca L-3 Grasshopper, a light airplane used by the USAAF during World War II
 Avia L.3, an Italian plane used for training by the Regia Aeronautica
 Macchi L.3, a 1916 Italian biplane flying boats 
 Soyuz 7K-L3, a crewed lunar lander design type in Russia's Soyuz space program
 N1/L3, the Soviet crewed lunar landing program

Other modes of transportation
 L3/33 and L3/35, Italian tankettes used in World War II
 L03, a Chevrolet Small-Block engine model
 Soviet submarine L-3, a 1931 Leninets class minelayer submarine
 SP&S Class L-3, an 1883 steam locomotives class
 L3 (New York City bus), a temporary bus route in New York City
 LNER Class L3, a class of British steam locomotives 
 The Kingsford branch of the CBD and South East Light Rail in Sydney, Australia, is numbered L3

Other uses in science and technology
 L3, a form of low-alloy special purpose steel
 L3 (CERN), one of the four detectors of the Large Electron-Positron Collider
 L3 (length^3), volume
 The third Lagrange Point in a gravitational system
 Latitude/Longitude Locator, an STS-32 Space Shuttle mission experiment

See also
 LLL (disambiguation)
 Level 3 (disambiguation)
 L band, radio frequencies in the electromagnetic spectrum